National Road No. 1 is a major highway in the Democratic Republic of the Congo.  It runs from the western port of Banana though the cities of Kinshasa, Kananga, Mbuji-Mayi, Lubumbashi, and ends at Kasumbalesa in the southeast of the country where it connects with the T3 road in Zambia. The road contains the Matadi Bridge, the largest bridge in the country, which spans the Congo River.

Rebuilding

In 2008, following the Sicomines minerals for infrastructure deal, the DRC awarded a no bid contract to China Railway rebuild several sections of the N1 and collect tolls. According to banking data made public by the  leaks, some of the toll revenue was redirected to the relatives and entourage of then president Joseph Kabila.

In 2019, the African Development Bank provided a XUA 50,570,000 loan to rehabilitate the section between Kinshasa and Batshamba, which was completed in 2021. In 2022, the ADB approved another $250 million for the section between Mbuji-Mayi and Kananga.

See also
 National Road 2 (Democratic Republic of the Congo)

References

National Road No. 1